Len Carlson (September 2, 1937 – January 26, 2006) was a Canadian voice actor who has voiced various characters on many animated television series from the 1960s to the 2000s, an occasional live-action TV actor, and a Kraft Canada TV pitchman during the 1970s and 1980s. He was a native of Edmonton and a former professional athlete.

Career
He was the voice of Big Boss, Sundown and Mace on C.O.P.S., Senator Robert Kelly (and the Supreme Intelligence) on X-Men (1992), Bert Raccoon and Pigs Two and Three in The Raccoons (and a voice director for the show from 1990 onwards), Putter from Popples, Mr. Frumble, Mr. Gronkle, and Mayor Fox in The Busy World of Richard Scarry, Professor Coldheart in Care Bears (1985), and Rocket Robin Hood in some of the third-season episodes. He was also the voice of Allo and Quackpot on the TV series, Dinosaucers and he was the original voice of the Green Goblin in Spider-Man the original series (1967) and the voice of Buzz in the show Cyberchase (2002). Also, he was the voice of Sterling Überbucks, his brother Carling, his great grandfather Sterling Überrucks and his nephew Stewie on Roboroach (2002) and the title character in the short-lived Swamp Thing (1991) animated series.

He also voiced all the male characters in two animated 1970s series (The Undersea Adventures of Captain Nemo and The Toothbrush Family), was the voice of Ace the Seagull and Sharkey Shark in the children's TV series The Waterville Gang and did voices for movies including The Nutcracker Prince, Care Bears: Journey to Joke-a-lot, The Great Defender of Fun, and reindeer voices in the live-action feature Blizzard.

In his last years, Carlson was a regular on Nelvana-produced shows such as Rolie Polie Olie, Cyberchase, Pecola, Donkey Kong Country, Medabots, Beetlejuice, and Beyblade as the main antagonist Gideon (season two). Most recently, he appeared in the French-Canadian co-production Atomic Betty, voiced the characters Hugo and Q in the video game Street Fighter III 3rd Strike and narrated the animated bible TV series Friends and Heroes. He also voiced Herc Stormsailor in the 1980s show Jayce and the Wheeled Warriors.

Death
Carlson died of a heart attack in Keswick, Ontario, at the age of 68 on January 26, 2006. The season two finale of Atomic Betty, "Takes One To Know One", the Cyberchase episode "Ecohaven Ooze", and the Bigfoot Presents: Meteor and the Mighty Monster Trucks episode "Space Rangers!" were all dedicated to his memory.

Filmography

References

External links

 Eulogy by Kevin Gillis

1937 births
2006 deaths
20th-century Canadian male actors
21st-century Canadian male actors
Canadian male voice actors
Male actors from Edmonton
Canadian voice directors